National Use Your Gift Card Day is a shopping holiday that takes place yearly on the third Saturday of January. It is an unofficial observance with the inaugural observance taking place on January 18, 2020. National Use Your Gift Card Day encourages people to remember to use their gift cards.

Based on an estimate from the Mercator Advisory Group, nearly $100 billion per year is spent on holiday gift cards, but as much as 3% of the cards will never get redeemed. The observance has been recognized by Chase’s Calendar of Events and by the Registrar at National Day Calendar. The idea gained traction in the retail industry, with major chains supporting the holiday.

National Use Your Gift Card Day was founded by Tracy Tilson who formed a limited liability company to support the National Use Your Gift Card Day movement. National Use Your Gift Card Day is also a registered trademark.

See also

References

External links
 
 The Retail Gift Card Association

January observances
personal finance
unofficial observances